Maya Arriz Tamza is the nom de plume of Saoud Bousselmania (born October 27, 1957), an Algerian writer.

He was born in the Aures region of Algeria and came to Marseilles in 1963. He is the co-founder of the Théâtre des Sept Chandelles in Maubourguet.

Selected works 
 Lune et Orian, oriental tale (1987)
 Ombres, novel (1989)
 Quelque part en Barbarie, novel (1993)
 Le Soupire de Maure (The Moor's sigh), play (2001)
 Les sept perles du sou, novel (2009)

References 

1957 births
Living people
Algerian novelists
Algerian male short story writers
Algerian dramatists and playwrights
20th-century pseudonymous writers
21st-century pseudonymous writers
21st-century Algerian people